St Monica's Catholic Church is a parish of the Roman Catholic Church in the Palmers Green area of north London. The parish church is situated at the junction of Stonard Road and Green Lanes in the London Borough of Enfield.

It is one of only two parishes in the Diocese of Westminster to be dedicated to Saint Monica, the other being that of St Monica's Priory, Hoxton.

Originally founded as a mission church, it then became established as a parish, with a presbytery built alongside in 1931.

As of 2021, the church has two priests, a parish sister and a lay youthworker. The church activities include community programmes and social action alongside worship and pastoral care.

History

The parish church was founded as a mission church in 1910. Father Thomas Heditch was appointed rector of the new parish in 1910, but fell ill in the spring of 1912. He went on a pilgrimage to Lourdes, but did not return. Then Father Patrick Gallagher was appointed rector on 27 June 1912.

Father Gallagher (whose Grandnephew was Dr Joseph Cassidy the former Archbishop of Tuam) originally came from the parish of Midfield, County Mayo in Ireland. He was a late recruit to the priesthood, having previously been a builder based in the Northeast of England (He had this business along with his brother John, Cassidy's grandfather; John would go on to own the Railway Hotel, now Douglas Kelly's Solicitors, in Swinford, Co. Mayo after they disbanded their building company). After a family tragedy he joined the priesthood, and became the main driving force in the building of St. Monica's Church. Using his considerable resources and connections within the building industry, Fr Gallagher managed to build the church within two years of his arrival.

The church's official opening was on Monday 4 May 1914 by Francis Cardinal Bourne in front of nearly 600 lay people and 40 clergy. The church, together with the presbytery, was built for £6,600 including the cost of the site.

Then in 1954 Fr Gallagher built St. Monica's Primary School on land in nearby Cannon Hill in Southgate. This was to be his last and dearest ambition achieved, for three years later on 11 December 1957, Fr Gallagher finally passed from this world with his work complete. He is buried with his family in Stanley, County Durham in the northeast of England.

The church started an amateur dramatic society, Saint Monica's Players (SMP), in 1958 that continues to perform musicals across Enfield today.

From 1935 to 1987, the parish hall was used for a repertory theatre, the Intimate Theatre.

The Interior

In 1920, Father Gallagher attended the Passion Play at Oberammergau in Bavaria, Germany.  He was impressed by the wood carving industry there. He promptly ordered the Sacred Heart altar and a Lady altar (which has since been removed), the statues of St Monica and St Joseph, two confessional boxes and a handsome pulpit with an effective sounding board (also removed).

The Sacred Heart Chapel

Situated in the traditional south west corner of the church, the Sacred Heart Chapel was an anonymous gift from an early parishioner.  The walls are lined with stone mosaic in various patterns and rich colours in the Byzantine style.  Two angels bear parts of one of Jesus' revelations to Sister Margret Mary in the 1670s:  'Behold this Heart' on the left and 'Which has so loved men' on the right.  The Sacred Heart statue is in the centre of the wooden altar, surrounded by intricate carving.  The painted panels on each side of the statue depict on the left, St Peter receiving the keys of the Church from Jesus, while on the right, Jesus showing his Sacred Heart to Sister Margret Mary, in the chapel where she lived and worked.  The stained glass window, by Franz Mayer & Co of Munich, portrays Jesus surrounded by children and has the superscription: 'Suffer little children to come unto me' (Mark 10:14).  A line below the images invites people to 'Pray for the Donors'.

Statues

The statue of St Monica, with St Augustine as a baby in a boat at her feet, stands in front of the modern Reconciliation Room.  This was built in the Baptistery, which itself was added to the church in 1964. 
The statue of St Joseph, holding a lily, the symbol of the Christian virtue of chastity, is adjacent to the Sacred Heart Chapel. 
The Statue of St Mary is in a niche on the north wall and has a popular candle stand and the Book of Remembrance below.

The Stations of the Cross

Originally framed, the fourteen Stations of the Cross, carved in oak, were commissioned by Father Gallagher.  We have been unable to find where they came from and when.  The frames are long gone now and set against the plain walls of the Church, the individual images tell the story of Christ's crucifixion in a simple and dignified way.

The Organ

The organ, used for the first time at Christmas in 1924, was described by The Tablet as 'An instrument of great power and beautiful tone'.  There was a service to bless it in early January 1925.  Cardinal Francis Bourne was due to attend but was indisposed.  St Monica's was the second home for the organ, but no-one knows where it was previously.  It was refurbished in spring 2014.  It is positioned in the organ loft, which sits above the church porch.

The Crucifix

The large wooden crucifix with an expressive, carved Christ (origin unknown) has been hung in various places around the Church down the years.  Currently in hangs along the south wall and every year on Remembrance Sunday, the congregation turns to face it for a brief service of Remembrance and two minutes' silence.

Sanctuary Window

The sanctuary window above the altar was originally plain glass.  For some years it had a curtain across it and the large wooden cross hung there.  In 1984, an anonymous donor provided the new window.  It was painted by the Maltese artist Carmel Cauchi (born 1927) who said 'It shows Christ in the glory of His resurrection. Jesus is the light'.

Lighting

New lights were installed in 2010, in time for the celebration of the centenary of the founding of the parish. Designed by Bruce Kirk of Light Perceptions, they were built in Lancashire.  Their design reflects that of the original lights from 1914.

Parish Priests 
 1910 - Father Thomas Heditch
 1912 - Father Patrick Gallagher
 1957 - Father Reginald Crook
 1964 - Father Raymund Geraerts
 1979 - Father Robin Whitney
 1994 - Father Brian Creak
 2004 - Canon Roger Taylor
 2008 - Canon Shaun Lennard
 2017 - Canon Mehall Lowry

Curates 
 1916 - Father Wilfred Harrington
 1918 - Father John Sheeran 
 1921 - Father William Gordon
 1936 - Father Patrick Murphy
 1949 - Father Henry Dodd
 1950 - Father Edward Short
 1951 - Father Peter Boshell
 1958 - Father Adrian Peeler
 1963 - Father Hilary Crewe 
 1967 - Father Keith Abram
 1972 - Father Samuel Steer 
 1979 - Father Frans Azzopardi
 1986 - Father Patrick Miscampbell OSB 
 1990 - Father Stephen Weaver 
 1995 - Father Dennis Touw
 2002 - Father Joe Mazarello
 2004 - Father Shaun Church 
 2007 - Father Philip Dyer-Perry 
 2011 - Father Andrew Gallagher 
 2014 - Father Paulo Bagini 
 2017 - Father John Warnarby 
 2019 - Father Stewart Hasker
 2022 - Father Paul Zhao SVD

References

External links

BBC: News Read on Father Roger in Action
Westminster Diocese
Saint Monica's Enfield amateur dramatic society

20th-century Roman Catholic church buildings in the United Kingdom
Churches in the Roman Catholic Diocese of Westminster
Saint Monica
Roman Catholic churches completed in 1914
Roman Catholic churches in the London Borough of Enfield